Maya Alexandria Hayes (born March 26, 1992) is an American soccer coach and former player, who is currently the assistant coach for the Minnesota Golden Gophers women's soccer team.

Hayes last played in 2017 as a forward for Sky Blue FC of the National Women's Soccer League. A United States youth international, Hayes won the 2012 FIFA U-20 Women's World Cup in Japan.

Early life
Hayes was born in New York City to Irene Smith and Derek Hayes. She has four siblings. Hayes attended Newark Academy, a private school located in Livingston, New Jersey. She grew up in West Orange, New Jersey.

College career
Hayes attended Pennsylvania State University from 2010 to 2013 where she played for the Nittany Lions. In 2011, she scored 31 goals, earned 70 points, and led the nation in goals and points. She set a new Penn State and Big Ten Conference record for points in a single season. Hayes finished her Penn State career having scored 71 goals in 89 matches, the third-most in program history.

In January 2020, she was named to TopDrawerSoccer.com's best XI of the 2010s.

Club career
Hayes was selected by Sky Blue FC in the first round (sixth overall pick) of the 2014 NWSL College Draft. A few weeks later, the team signed her.

In 2018, it was announced that she had made the decision to sit out the 2018 NWSL season to pursue graduate studies at Auburn University. She does not consider this an official retirement.

International career
Hayes previously played for the United States under-18 women's national soccer team. She competed for the United States at the 2010 and 2012 FIFA Under-20 Women's World Cup tournaments. On August 20, 2012, at Hiroshima Big Arch, she scored a hat-trick in a 4–0 win against Ghana, in the first match played by the United States at the 2012 FIFA Under-20 Women's World Cup; the first goal was an own goal by Ghanaian Linda Addai. Three days later, at the same venue, in the second match against China, she scored a 36th-minute equalizer goal to tie the game at 1-1, which was also the final score. In their last match in Group D, the United States team conceded a 0–3 loss to Germany; and advanced to the second stage based on goal difference, with all goals scored by Hayes besides one aforementioned own goal. With no further goal from Hayes in the knock-out stage, the United States team won the 2012 Japan FIFA Under-20 Women's World Cup tournament with two goals from Kealia Ohai and one goal each from Vanessa DiBernardo and Morgan Brian.

Personal life
Hayes identifies as gay.

See also

 2012 CONCACAF Under-20 Women's Championship squads
 2010 FIFA U-20 Women's World Cup squads

References

External links

 Maya Hayes profile at National Women's Soccer League
 Maya Hayes profile at Sky Blue FC
 
 U.S. Soccer player profile
 Penn State player profile
 

1992 births
Living people
American women's soccer players
Newark Academy alumni
NJ/NY Gotham FC players
National Women's Soccer League players
Penn State Nittany Lions women's soccer players
Sportspeople from Essex County, New Jersey
Soccer players from New York City
People from West Orange, New Jersey
Women's association football forwards
NJ/NY Gotham FC draft picks
United States women's under-20 international soccer players
New Jersey Wildcats players
American LGBT sportspeople
LGBT people from New York (state)
LGBT association football players
LGBT African Americans
African-American women's soccer players
Lesbian sportswomen
21st-century African-American sportspeople
21st-century African-American women